Ratarda javanica is a moth in the family Cossidae. It is found on Java.

References

Natural History Museum Lepidoptera generic names catalog

Ratardinae